Antonio D'Oppido (born 27 August 1944) is a retired Italian swimmer who won the 200 m individual medley event at the 1971 Mediterranean Games. He continued competing in his 60s, at the national level. His brother Michele is also a competitive swimmer.

References

Date of birth unknown
Living people
People from Crotone
Italian male medley swimmers
Italian male freestyle swimmers
1944 births
Mediterranean Games gold medalists for Italy
Swimmers at the 1971 Mediterranean Games
Mediterranean Games medalists in swimming
Sportspeople from the Province of Crotone
20th-century Italian people
21st-century Italian people